Šarić (sometimes spelled Saric or Sharich in English) is a surname common in Croatia, Bosnia and Herzegovina, Montenegro and Serbia.

It is the second most common surname in the Zadar County of Croatia, and among the most frequent ones in another county.

It may refer to:

Aleksandar Šarić (born 1974), Serbian footballer
Asif Šarić (born 1965), Bosnian football player and manager
Cvijan Šarić ( 1652–1668), Venetian commander
Daniel Šarić (born 1972), Croatian former footballer
Danijel Šarić (handballer) (born 1977), Bosnian Serb handball player
Dario Šarić (born 1994), Croatian basketball player, son of Predrag
Dario Šarić (born 1997), Bosnian footballer 
Darko Šarić (born 1969), Serbian suspected drug trafficker
Domagoj Šarić (born 1999), Croatian basketball player
Dragana Šarić (known as Bebi Dol, born 1962), Serbian singer song-writer and actress
Dragiša Šarić (1961-2008), Serbian basketball player
Igor Šarić (born 1967), Croatian tennis player
Ivan Šarić (disambiguation), several people
Kenan Šarić (born 1997), Bosnian footballer
Marko Šarić (born 1998), Serbian footballer 
Martin Šarić (born 1979), Argentine footballer
Mirko Šarić (1978-2000), Argentine footballer
Miroslav Šarić (born 1986), Croatian footballer
Nenad Šarić (1947-2012), Croatian musician, drummer of Novi Fosili
Predrag Šarić (born 1959), Croatian basketball player, father of Dario
Samir Šarić (born 1984), Bosnian footballer
Sandra Šarić (born 1984), Croatian taekwondo athlete
Tomislav Šarić (born 1990), Croatian footballer
Velma Šarić (born 1979), Bosnian journalist
Veselinka Šarić née Crvak (born 1971), Croatian basketball player

References

Bosnian surnames
Croatian surnames
Serbian surnames